Robert C. Jackson (born March 13, 1936) was a Canadian politician. He served in the Legislative Assembly of New Brunswick from 1982 to 1987 from the electoral district of St. Stephen-Milltown, a member of the Progressive Conservative party.

References

1936 births
Living people
Members of the Legislative Assembly of New Brunswick
Progressive Conservative Party of New Brunswick MLAs
20th-century Canadian politicians